Recorte Records was a music publisher founded by Murray Jacobs in March 1958. They were a significant publisher of doo-wop material from New York.
Artists included:
Big Joe Hardin
Bob Gerardi and The Classic Four
Danny Winchell
Evelyn Sharp
The Gems
Lenny Dean
 Nino and the Ebb Tides
 Rockin' Chairs
Pete Ciolino

Chart history
On September 4. 1961, Nino and the Ebb Tides' Jukebox Saturday Night charted on Billboard's Top 100, reaching number 57.

References

Record labels established in 1958
Defunct record labels of the United States
Defunct mass media companies of the United States
American record labels
Doo-wop
1958 establishments in New York (state)